The 1961 Honduran Amateur League was the 14th edition of the Honduran Amateur League. Club Deportivo Olimpia obtained its 4th national title.  The season ran from 9 March 1961 to 19 November 1961.

Regional champions

Known results

National championship round
Played in a double round-robin format between the regional champions.  Also known as the Cuadrangular.

Known results

Olimpia's lineup

References

Liga Amateur de Honduras seasons
Honduras
1961 in Honduran sport